George Smith (13 January 1876 – 16 January 1929) was an English first-class cricketer, who played two games for Yorkshire County Cricket Club between 1901 and 1906.

Smith was born in Thorp Arch, Wetherby, Yorkshire, England, and made his first-class debut against Cambridge University in 1901, and reappeared in 1906 against Warwickshire. He batted just once in that time, scoring seven runs. Smith took 0 for 62 with the ball, but held three catches.

Smith died in January 1929, in Thorp Arch, Yorkshire.

References

External links
Cricket Archive
Cricinfo

1876 births
1929 deaths
Yorkshire cricketers
English cricketers
People from Wetherby
Cricketers from Yorkshire